Palmyra Methodist Episcopal Church is an historic structure located in rural Warren County, Iowa, United States.   It was built in 1868 and listed on the National Register of Historic Places in 1979.

The frame church building was built by William Wilson Myrick and Eli Myrick.  The church hosted Chatauqua revivals through the early 1940s as well as traveling evangelists who would come to the area by train.  After it lost its congregation the church sat empty and was nearly torn down in 1978 when Friends of Palmyra Church was formed to save the building.  Its contents were sold in 1979.  The building was renovated in 1984 and period light fixtures, a pot-bellied stove, leaded windows and pews were installed in the building.  Artist P. Buckley Moss has used the church in some of her paintings.

References

Churches completed in 1868
19th-century Methodist church buildings in the United States
Methodist churches in Iowa
Churches on the National Register of Historic Places in Iowa
National Register of Historic Places in Warren County, Iowa